Yngve Lundh (5 April 1924 – 10 March 2017) was a Swedish cyclist. He competed in the individual and team road race events at the 1952 Summer Olympics.

References

External links
 

1924 births
2017 deaths
Swedish male cyclists
Olympic cyclists of Sweden
Cyclists at the 1952 Summer Olympics
People from Bollnäs
Sportspeople from Gävleborg County